Moondials are time pieces similar to a sundial. The most basic moondial, which is identical to a sundial, is only accurate on the night of the full moon. Every night after it becomes an additional (on average) 48 minutes slow, while every night preceding the full moon it is (again on average) 49 minutes fast, assuming there is even enough light to take a reading by. Thus, one week to either side of the full moon the moondial will read 5 hours and 36 minutes before or after the proper time. 

More advanced moondials can include charts showing the exact calculations to get the correct time, as well as dials designed with latitude and longitude in mind. 

Moondials are very closely associated with lunar gardening (night-blooming plants) and some comprehensive gardening books may mention them.

See also
 Time

Notes

Bibliography 
 Ralf Kern: Wissenschaftliche Instrumente in ihrer Zeit. Vom 15. – 19. Jahrhundert. Verlag der Buchhandlung Walther König 2010, 

Clocks
Timekeeping
Sundials